Alexandru Şuli (10 August 1928 – 2000) was a Romanian wrestler. He competed in the men's Greco-Roman heavyweight at the 1952 Summer Olympics.

References

External links
 

1928 births
2000 deaths
Romanian male sport wrestlers
Olympic wrestlers of Romania
Wrestlers at the 1952 Summer Olympics
People from Lugoj